Sigmund Stern Recreation Grove, locally called Stern Grove, is a  recreational site in the Sunset District, San Francisco, California.  It is administered by the city's Recreation and Parks Department and is the concert setting for the Stern Grove Festival, which has taken place annually since 1938.

History 

The site, along Sloat Boulevard between 19th and 34th Avenues about two miles (3 km) south of the Golden Gate Park, was donated to the city in 1931 by Rosalie Meyer Stern. She was the daughter of Marc Eugene Meyer, who named the park for her late husband Sigmund Stern, a philanthropist, nephew of Levi Strauss, and son of David Stern.

The original Stern Grove landscaping and facilities were built by the Works Progress Administration. It consists of several park sections including the Concert Meadow, the West Meadow, and Pine Lake Park.   The grove's Pine Lake is one of three natural lakes in the city of San Francisco.  In 2005, Stern Grove underwent a $15 million renovation, designed by landscape architect Lawrence Halprin.  New features included drainage improvements and erosion control, an expanded outdoor stage and performance facilities, and terraces and additional bleacher-style seating, built of stone walls, along the slope opposite the stage.

Since 1932, the Stern Grove Festival has presented weekly concerts and performances in the outdoor amphitheater during the summer months. Supported entirely by contributions, the concerts have always been free to the public. Crowds have often exceeded 20,000 people.

See also

 Trocadero, San Francisco
 Parks in San Francisco, California
 Project Insight

Notes

References
 A 1953 history of Stern Grove from the Virtual Museum of the City of San Francisco
 Early history of Stern Grove from the Western Neighborhoods Project
 Renovation of Stern Grove by landscape architect Lawrence Halprin, San Francisco Chronicle article.

External links

 

Parks in San Francisco
Music venues in San Francisco
Sunset District, San Francisco
Outdoor theatres
Theatres in San Francisco
Historic American Buildings Survey in California
Works Progress Administration in California
Bay Area Ridge Trail